Marzel is a surname. Notable people with the surname include:

 Baruch Marzel (21st century), Israeli politician
Itamar Marzel (born 1949), Israeli basketball player
 Ron Marzel (21st century), Canadian lawyer

See also 
 Jakob Marzel Sternberger (1750–1822), the first mayor of the town of Kadaň in the Czech Republic